Mitch Butler, the "Investigative Cartoonist," is a television personality and illustrator who specializes in visual explanation.  He has explained current events on The CBS Evening News with Katie Couric, CBS News Sunday Morning, The CBS Early Show with Harry Smith, and the Science Channel's Brink.  In addition to his on-camera work, he also produces non-fiction animation for television programs like Nova.  Mitch Butler collaborates with newsman Josh Landis at CBS to create The Fast Draw, an ongoing cartoon explanation series.

Career
Mitch Butler has taught animated storytelling and visual explanation at New York University, and The School of Visual Arts and Parsons School of Design.

Personal information
Mitch Butler was born and raised in Alaska, and now lives in New York City with wife Denise Spellman Butler.

References

External links
 Mitch Butler Bio at CBS News
 Mitch Butler at speaking engagements
 Mitch Butler's blog
 Mitch Butler Explain-o-Graphics

American television personalities
Living people
Year of birth missing (living people)
American illustrators